The Halton-Wagner Tennis Complex is a facility located on the campus of the University of North Carolina at Charlotte. Rebuilt in 2011, the facility is home to the 49ers men's and women's tennis teams.

Courts
The current 12 courts were constructed to replace 15 previous courts located in the same place at the corner of Phillips Rd. and Cameron Blvd. The court is laid over a post-tension concrete slab which provides a medium-fast ball speed on impact.

Buildings
The courts are served by a small building with men's and women's locker rooms.

A new two-story support facility is between the courts and Cameron Blvd. The new tennis building includes new offices for the men's and women's tennis coaches, new men's and women's locker rooms, a racquet stringing room, and training room with ice and warm baths and taping area. The new building opened in the Spring of 2012.

Photos

Statues
Two Richard Hallier athletic statues grace the facility's front entrance. They depict a male and a female tennis player in action. Like the twelve other Hallier sports statues on campus, they were donations by Charlotte businessman Irwin "Ike" Belk.

References

External links
Capital projects page
JE Dunn Construction Company
Chancy & Theys Construction Company
Campus Statues at UNC Charlotte

University of North Carolina at Charlotte
Sports venues in Charlotte, North Carolina
College tennis venues in the United States
2011 establishments in North Carolina
Sports venues completed in 2011